

Number plan

References

Wallis and Futuna
Communications in Wallis and Futuna